The Chicago Power were an indoor soccer club based in Chicago, Illinois that competed in the American Indoor Soccer Association and National Professional Soccer League.

After the 1995–96 season, the team was sold to Peter Pocklington, moved and became the Edmonton Drillers.

Year-by-year

Outdoor play
Although the Power was primarily known only as an indoor team, in the summer of 1992 they formed a full outdoor squad. Home matches were played at St. Charles High School's Norris Stadium and at Hanson Stadium on the Northwest Side. In addition to several exhibition matches they participated in the 1992 Professional Cup alongside five APSL and two CSL clubs. Chicago also took part in another international series dubbed Copa Chicago '92 which included Liga MX's Tecos F.C. and Tigres UANL and the APSL's Miami Freedom. They finished last in both competitions. In eight outdoor matches that year the Power won only once, lost five times, while drawing twice. In 1993 several other APSL clubs joined them in summer outdoor play.

1992 Outdoor results

Notable players
 Randy Soderman
 Rick Soderman
 Patricio Margetic

Media coverage
The Chicago Power appeared locally, on SportsChannel Chicago. Howard Balson and Kenny Stern were the primary broadcast team in Chicago.

References

 
P
Defunct indoor soccer clubs in the United States
American Indoor Soccer Association teams
National Professional Soccer League (1984–2001) teams
1988 establishments in Illinois
1996 disestablishments in Illinois
Soccer clubs in Illinois
Association football clubs established in 1988
Association football clubs disestablished in 1996